The Watney family is an English family known for its association with the brewing firm Watney Combe & Reid, as well as for its political activities, philanthropy and missionary work. Members include:

 James Watney (1800–1884), brewer
 James Watney, Jr. MP (1832–1886), brewer and politician
 Herbert Watney (1843–1932), physician
 Sir John Watney (1834–1923), knight and charity secretary
 Claude Watney (1866–1919), brewer and motor dealer
 Katherine Watney (1870–1958), missionary
 Constance Watney (1878–1947), missionary

Also related to the Watneys by marriage are:

 Joseph Gurney Barclay (1879–1976), son-in-law of Herbert Watney
 Oliver Rainsford Barclay (1919–2013), grandson of Herbert Watney
 Rev. William Stephen Rainsford (1850–1933), brother-in-law of Herbert Watney
 Ada Annie Watney (née Nunn) (1868–1938), wife of Claude Watney

References

English families
Watney family
English brewers